Hlengiwe Buhle Mkhize (6 September 1952 – 16 September 2021) was a South African politician, who served as Minister of Higher Education and Training under President Jacob Zuma.

Early life and education
Mkhize was born on 6 September 1952.

She earned Bachelor of Arts in Psychology, Social Work and Sociology from the University of Zululand; Bachelor of Arts (Honours) in Psychology, and a Master of Clinical Psychology from the University of KwaZulu-Natal.

Career
Mkhize was a founding member, and trustee, of the Children and Violence Trust since 1995, had been a trustee of the Malibongwe Business Trust from 2005. She was a senior lecturer and researcher at Wits University from 1990 until 1995. Mkhize was a board member of the South African Prisoner's Organisation for Human Rights from 1994 to 1995; Truth and Reconciliation Commission (TRC) Commissioner and Chairperson of the Reparations and Rehabilitation committee from 1995 to 2003.

She was first elected to the National Assembly of South Africa in 2009 as part of the African National Congress.

She served as ambassador to the Netherlands, had a short stint as Deputy Minister for Correctional Services] and thereafter, from 2014 to 2017, served as the Deputy Minister of Telecommunications and Postal Services.

Mkhize was appointed Minister of Higher Education and Training  by former President Jacob Zuma on 17 October 2017, after previously serving as Deputy Minister of Telecommunications and Postal Services in the government of South Africa. In February 2018, she was sacked from cabinet by President Cyril Ramaphosa.

Death
Mkhize died on 16 September 2021, aged 69.

References

External links

 

1952 births
2021 deaths
Zulu people
African National Congress politicians
Members of the National Assembly of South Africa
Ministers of Home Affairs of South Africa
University of Zululand alumni
University of KwaZulu-Natal alumni
Female interior ministers
Women government ministers of South Africa
21st-century South African politicians